"Chuck Versus the Push Mix" is the thirteenth  episode of the fourth season of Chuck. It originally aired on January 31, 2011. Much like "Chuck Versus the Other Guy" in the third season, this episode was intended to be the fourth season finale before an additional eleven episodes were ordered. As a result, the episode featured the conclusion of several story arcs, and series co-creator Josh Schwartz boasted that it would end with the "best 10 minutes in the show's history".

Plot summary
The plot of "Chuck Versus the Push Mix" is fairly complicated with several story threads interwoven together, and much of the supporting cast figures into the overall mission in some way.

Volkoff Industries
Chuck Bartowski, Morgan Grimes, and Alex McHugh are in a hospital room next to an unconscious John Casey (from injuries sustained in the previous episode). Casey suddenly wakes and grunts the word "pants", leading them to find the piece of Yuri the Gobbler's glass eye in his pants pocket, which had been used to store the Hydra database. When Chuck asks where it came from, Casey grunts "Sarah", proving to Chuck that Sarah Walker has not actually gone rogue, and restoring his trust in her.

In Moscow, Sarah and Mary Elizabeth Bartowski (Linda Hamilton) infiltrate Alexei Volkoff's office while he is away. They try to access the Hydra network, but they learn that Volkoff has hidden it with "The Contessa". Volkoff later returns to his office to find every electronic device malfunctioning. A message appears on his screen, reading, "Hello Volkoff. I want my wife back." The message is then revealed to be from Orion (Stephen J. Bartowski), confusing Volkoff, as Stephen was killed by The Ring. Nevertheless, Volkoff decides to move Mary to the Contessa.

Meanwhile, Chuck flashes on the eye fragment, learning that it was designed by Roni Eimacher. Chuck reports this to General Beckman, who advises him to "stay put". However, Chuck and Morgan take on their own private mission and decide to locate Eimacher. When they interrogate him, it turns out he is not working with Volkoff, but was kidnapped to design the eye. When asked about the Contessa, he reveals that it is not a person but in fact a ship, which Volkoff uses as a mobile base. The duo infiltrate The Contessa and rendezvous with Sarah and Mary. Together, they attempt to access the Hydra database, but the system can only be accessed by Volkoff's voice, and they are locked inside. When Volkoff arrives, Mary is forced to stay behind and hold him at gunpoint to allow the others to escape. Volkoff overpowers her, but instead of executing her, he shows her a message sent by her husband, which shows directions to his location.

Volkoff goes to Stephen's cabin, where he finds not Stephen, but Chuck, who knocks him out and ties him up. When Volkoff regains consciousness, Chuck is pointing a gun at his head. Volkoff mocks his attempt at revenge while managing to escape from his bonds, revealing that his men will execute Mary unless he says otherwise and an assassin, Armand (Igor Jijikine), has been sent to kill both Casey and Ellie. However, Sarah returns to the Contessa and frees Mary while Casey defeats the assassin by playing dead and hitting him with a bonsai tree. As Volkoff holds Chuck at gunpoint, Chuck tricks him into saying the phrase required to access his network, which Morgan has secretly been recording, allowing them to transfer Hydra to a local computer. Volkoff brags that Chuck will still need an army to overpower his men outside, at which point General Beckman walks in and arrests him, his men already having been subdued. Beckman then allows Chuck and Morgan to take a helicopter to the hospital, where Ellie is in labor.

Casey and Alex
As Casey regains the ability to communicate,  Alex gives him a bonsai tree (which he is later forced to use to defeat Armand) to make him feel at home. When Ellie is in labor, Casey reveals to Devon that he regrets missing his own daughter's birth, and advises Devon not to make the same mistake. Morgan and Alex later join Casey as he wheels himself out of the hospital.

The Birth of Clara

Chuck prepares a "push mix" CD, compiled with music to help Ellie relax when she gives birth to her baby, and gives Devon Woodcomb a number to alert the CIA should any trouble arise. However, Jeff Barnes and Lester Patel steal the CD, planning to give a live performance for the baby instead.

Ellie's water soon breaks. However, Devon discovers that the Push Mix CD is missing and panics. He calls the number Chuck gave him, and agents quickly transport them to the hospital. Seeing that he is worried, Ellie tells Devon to wait outside, where he becomes even more uncomfortable after seeing a room full of babies. Casey advises that he not miss his daughter's birth, as Casey missed Alex's. Meanwhile, the Jeffster! duo arrive at the hospital, but are refused direction to Ellie's room, as they are not family members. Instead, they play "Push It" over the public address system, only to be hauled out by hospital security.

Chuck, Casey, Morgan, Sarah, and Mary arrive, but only one family member is allowed to enter Ellie's room, so Chuck chooses Mary to be by her daughter's side. Ellie expresses her joy that Mary could witness the birth of her granddaughter, and Mary reveals that everyone is there for her. Mary witnesses Dr. Ayub (Sonita Henry) deliver her granddaughter, Clara Woodcomb. Devon describes the overwhelming experience of holding his daughter for the first time as "Awesome".

Chuck and Sarah
When Casey regains consciousness, he proves to Chuck that Sarah has not actually gone rogue, restoring Chuck's trust in her. They reconcile on the Contessa and passionately kiss.

Chuck finally proposes to Sarah in the hospital hallway. She accepts, kneeling with him and kissing him as the scene fades.

Production

Continuity
Stephen's cabin from "Chuck Versus the Living Dead" is revisited.
After Chuck reveals himself to be in the cabin, he says "Hello Alexei, I believe you were looking for me." Volkoff himself says the same thing to Chuck in "Chuck Versus the First Fight" when he reveals his identity.
The image labeled as "Moscow" is actually the Buda Castle in Budapest, Hungary, not the Kremlin Palace.

Flashes
Chuck flashes on an engineer who designed Hydra.

Cultural references
Jeff and Lester wear Salt-N-Pepa jackets while singing "Push It".
Stephen's "Twin Pines cabin" references Back to the Future.
Morgan's use of yoga to get through a hallway full of lasers references Entrapment.
Morgan identifies Ronnie Eicherman through his online Settlers of Catan league.
Volkoff states that he purchased The Contessa through the classified ads website, Craigslist Dubai.

The SUV with Volkoff arriving at The Contessa referenced Back To The Future with the license plate 1PT21GW (1.21 gigawatts)

Reception
"Chuck Versus the Push Mix" drew 5.57 million viewers.

Eric Goldman of IGN gave this episode a score of 8.5 out of 10, praising Dalton's performance. Goldman wrote, "Even while I was macabrely vexing the non-death of Casey, I couldn't resist the final moments of this episode, which worked like gangbusters. Seeing Devon holding his baby daughter for the first time and declaring, 'Awesome,' was wonderfully effective, because look, even the Captain has to admit that's truly the most awesome thing he's seen. And I loved how Chuck proposing to Sarah was handled – on the fly, with a guy cleaning the floor behind them. The fact that we didn't hear what Chuck said was perfect too. We knew what he was saying, basically, and knew more than enough about them as a couple to not have to hear the exact words."

HitFix writer Alan Sepinwall questioned Schwartz's statement that the episode ended with the "best 10 minutes in the show's history". Sepinwall also wrote, "Kudos to whichever member of the production team - whether it was writers Rafe Judkins and Lauren LeFranc, or director Peter Lauer, or someone else - decided to frame the proposal in the background of the shot, with the dialogue overwhelmed by the sound of the floor waxer. We already heard the big flowery speech and swelling music when Chuck almost proposed in 'Chuck vs. the Balcony,' and we know from Levi and Strahovski's body language what happened here - I say give the kids a little moment to themselves, okay? It probably had more power for being done this way."

Steve Heisler of The A.V. Club gave the episode a B. Heisler stated, "Thankfully, there were literally only two moments in 'Push Mix' that felt remotely gratuitous on the Chuck and Sarah front: One was the major smooch when the two reunite on the Contessa; the other comes at the very end, a marriage proposal overshadowed by the whir of a hospital floor waxer. Both moments, even that final one, were dealt with quickly and showed no signs of labor (to say nothing of what was literally happening in the other room)."

Couch Baron of Television Without Pity gave the episode an A, saying "I think everyone's in agreement that now, finally, Chuck really is a CIA agent."

References

External links
 

Push Mix
2011 American television episodes
Television episodes written by Rafe Judkins